Serge Duigou (born 17 February 1948, Pont-l'Abbé, Pays Bigouden in sud-Finistère) is a French historian, specialising in the history of Brittany.

Works

References

Living people
1948 births
20th-century French historians
Breton historians
People from Pont-l'Abbé
French male non-fiction writers